The 2004 Clásica de Almería was the 19th edition of the Clásica de Almería cycle race and was held on 29 February 2004. The race was won by Jérôme Pineau.

General classification

References

2004
2004 in road cycling
2004 in Spanish sport